Barragup is a locality near Mandurah, Western Australia, located north of Pinjarra Road and east of the Serpentine River within the Shire of Murray. Its postcode is 6209. At the 2016 census, Barragup had a population of 806.

It is a largely rural locality with some low-level commercial development along Pinjarra Road and was only served by a deviation of the Transperth 598 bus route along Pinjarra Road between the river and Ronlyn Road until October 2012, when two additional bus services - 600 and 604 - were added to service the settlements further east along Pinjarra Road.

References

Towns in Western Australia
Suburbs of Mandurah
Shire of Murray